360 Market Square, previously known as Market Square Tower, is a residential skyscraper in downtown Indianapolis, Indiana. 360 Market Square stands on the northern portion of the block formerly home to Market Square Arena. It is the third tallest residential building in Indianapolis (after Riley Towers I and II) and is the 15th tallest building in the city overall. 360 Market Square includes a  ground-level Starbucks, a  Whole Foods, and 525-space parking garage. The project cost totaled .

The City of Indianapolis contributed $5.6 million in land for the project and expended $17 million in tax-increment financing money for infrastructure. City officials were highly engaged in the building's design, requiring a curvilinear building that would include a grocery store.

The project experienced a series of setbacks during construction. Contaminated soil, structural problems, and contractor payment disputes delayed the tower's opening by over a year. The project's height was also shortened following the design phase. Initially, 360 Market Square was set to be the ninth tallest building in Indianapolis and the tallest residential building in Indiana.

See also
Market East
List of tallest buildings in Indianapolis
List of tallest buildings in Indiana

References

External links 

 
 Flaherty & Collins Properties

Residential skyscrapers in Indianapolis
Residential buildings completed in 2018
2018 establishments in Indiana